James Robert Rebhorn (September 1, 1948 – March 21, 2014) was an American character actor who appeared in over 100 films, television series, and plays. At the time of his death, he had recurring roles in the series White Collar and Homeland. He also appeared in films such as Scent of a Woman, The Game, Carlito's Way, Independence Day, My Cousin Vinny, and Meet the Parents.

Early life
Rebhorn was born in Philadelphia, Pennsylvania, the son of Ardell Frances (née Hoch) and James Harry Rebhorn, an industrial engineer and salesman. He was of German descent. Rebhorn moved to Anderson, Indiana, as a child and graduated from Madison Heights High School in 1966. A devout Lutheran, he attended Wittenberg University in Springfield, Ohio, where he studied political science.

While there, he was a member of the Lambda Chi Alpha fraternity. Richard S. Huffman was one of his instructors and directed him in a lead role in Aristophanes' Lysistrata as well as Molière's Tricks of Scapin. After graduating in 1970, Rebhorn moved to New York City, where he earned a Master of Fine Arts in acting from Columbia University's School of the Arts, and joined the metropolitan theater scene.

Career
An early performance was in Butterflies are Free at the Peterborough Players in New Hampshire in 1974. Rebhorn played Peter Latham in Forty Carats at the GasLight Dinner Theatre in Salt Lake City in the 1970s. He was known both for portraying WASP stereotypes, lawyers, politicians, doctors, and military men, as well as portraying individuals engaged in or responsible for criminal behavior.

He delivered equally notable performances in a variety of other roles, including that of a brutal serial killer on NBC's Law & Order (he would later return to the show in the recurring role of defense attorney Charles Garnett), Ellard Muscatine in Lorenzo's Oil (1992), Fred Waters in Blank Check (1994), Clyde Frost, the father of famed bullrider Lane Frost, in 8 Seconds (1994), Lt. Tyler in White Squall (1996), and a shipping magnate in The Talented Mr. Ripley (1999).

One of his best known performances was in the popular 1996 film Independence Day, where he played Secretary of Defense Albert Nimzicki. He acted in Scent of a Woman (1992), and played an expert witness in My Cousin Vinny (1992). He appeared in Carlito's Way as an obsessed district attorney the following year. Rebhorn played an FBI Agent in the 1994 film Guarding Tess.

Rebhorn played several roles on television, including an abusive stepfather, Bradley Raines, on the soap opera Guiding Light from 1983 to 1985, and an abusive father, Henry Lange, on sister soap As the World Turns from 1988 to 1991. An earlier daytime role was as John Brady in Texas from 1981 to 1982.

In 1991, he played the role of Ezra in the television movie/pilot Plymouth. He cameoed in Madonna's video for her single "Bad Girl" along with Christopher Walken (1993). In 1994, he appeared in an episode of the Nickelodeon series The Adventures of Pete & Pete, titled "Farewell, My Little Viking", as Mr. McFlemp.

In 1998, he played the District Attorney in the two part series finale of Seinfeld. He appeared in supporting roles in Regarding Henry, The Game, The Talented Mr. Ripley and Meet the Parents. In 2003, he appeared in the Chris Rock film Head of State, as Democratic Senator Bill Arnot.   In 2004, he appeared in the television miniseries Reversible Errors. His role in the short-lived and controversial NBC drama The Book of Daniel cast him as the father of the title character. From 2009 to 2013, Rebhorn played the recurring role of Reese Hughes, the FBI white collar division Chief, on White Collar.

Starting in 2011, Rebhorn appeared in the Showtime series Homeland as Frank Mathison, father of the series' main character Carrie Mathison, played by Claire Danes. His character suffered from bipolar disorder like Danes' character did. However, Frank had been able to get it under control and became quite functional on a daily basis with the correct dosing of medications, and would often encourage Carrie to do the same. Rebhorn's death in 2014 meant his character died in the show as well. The season 4 finale of Homeland was dedicated to him.

In 2004 he appeared on Broadway as Juror 4 in the Roundabout Theatre Company production of Twelve Angry Men at the American Airlines Theatre.

Rebhorn appeared as a judge in Baby Mama. In the movie The Box, Rebhorn portrayed a NASA scientist.  He had a recurring role on the series White Collar as Special Agent Reese Hughes. Rebhorn co-starred in the Comedy Central sitcom Big Lake in 2010. He played Max Kenton's uncle in the movie Real Steel in 2011. He starred as Oren in the miniseries Coma. Rebhorn starred as Gary Pandamiglio in the 2012 Mike Birbiglia comedy Sleepwalk with Me.

In 2012, he played the role of Archbishop McGovern in "Leap of Faith", the 13th episode of the second season of the CBS police procedural drama Blue Bloods. He co-starred in the romantic comedy The Perfect Wedding in 2013. His stage career included seven Broadway productions, as well as numerous appearances with New York City's Roundabout Theatre Company.

Personal life
Rebhorn was married to Rebecca Linn and was the father of two daughters.

Death 
Rebhorn lived in South Orange, New Jersey. On March 21, 2014, he died at his home as a result of melanoma at the age of 65. (He had been receiving hospice care at his home for the melanoma, which he had been battling since 1992.) Rebhorn wrote his own obituary.

Filmography

Film

Television

References

External links

 
 
 
 James Rebhorn biography at Yahoo! Movies
 20th Anniversary of My Cousin Vinny Interview at Abnormal Use

1948 births
2014 deaths
American male film actors
American Lutherans
American male soap opera actors
American male television actors
Male actors from Indiana
People from Anderson, Indiana
Male actors from Philadelphia
People from South Orange, New Jersey
Wittenberg University alumni
20th-century American male actors
21st-century American male actors
Columbia University School of the Arts alumni
Deaths from melanoma
Deaths from cancer in New Jersey
American male stage actors
20th-century Lutherans